The Leather Pushers is a 1922 American film serial starring Reginald Denny (and Billy Sullivan in the fourth series), and based on boxing stories by H. C. Witwer originally published in Collier's Weekly. The screenplays were written by a young Darryl F. Zanuck.

List of Episodes
1: Let's Go  
2: Round Two  
3: Payment Through the Nose  
4: A Fool and His Honey  
5: The Taming of the Shrewd 
6: Whipsawed
7: Young King Cole 
8: He Raised Kane  
9: The Chickasha Bone Crusher  
10: When Kane Met Abel  
11: Strike Father, Strike Son  
12: Joan of Newark 
13: The Wandering Two  
14: The Widower's Mite 
15: Don Coyote 
16: Something for Nothing  
17: Columbia, the Gem and the Ocean  
18: Barnaby's Grudge

Preservation status
Only episodes 2 and 3 exist, along with a trailer for the series.

See also
List of film serials

References

External links

 

1922 films
1922 drama films
1920s sports drama films
American black-and-white films
American boxing films
American silent serial films
American sports drama films
Films based on short fiction
Universal Pictures film serials
1920s American films
Silent American drama films
1920s English-language films
Silent sports drama films